Negeri Sembilan Football Association (NSFA), commonly referred to as PBNS, is a sports association that is responsible for handling association football sports affairs in Negeri Sembilan. This association is also the owner of Negeri Sembilan FC. PBNS is an association registered with the Office of the Sports Commissioner of Malaysia and one of the affiliates of the Football Association of Malaysia (FAM). PBNS is currently led by the President of PBNS, Tunku Syed Razman bin Tunku Syed Idrus Al-Qadri, who is also Tunku Besar Tampin. 
 
PBNS is also a partner of the Malaysia Football League (MFL), which is the main organiser of the Malaysian football league. The Negeri Sembilan team is currently participating in the Malaysian Super League competition. PBNS focuses on the Football Development Program in Negeri Sembilan, Coaching Courses, Referee Development, Men's and Women's Futsal, Beach Football, and the Women's Football Team, as well as activities at the grassroots level. In addition, PBNS is responsible for the organisation of the Local League according to age levels and the Major League as a platform for talent searches for the Youth Cup (U19) and President Cup (U21) teams. In addition, PBNS also focuses on cooperating to develop football at the district level with the affiliated associations under the auspices of the Negeri Sembilan Football Association. 
 
For 97 years, PBNS has fully managed the Negeri Sembilan football team, better known as the Negeri Sembilan FA, which has brought many successes to the team. In 2020, PBNS decided to privatise Negeri Sembilan as a football club known as Negeri Sembilan FC (NSFC). Since then, the roles of PBNS and NSFC have been separated, with each focusing on its respective role. NSFC is registered as a private football club under the name NSFC Pvt. Ltd. and has become a subsidiary of PBNS.

History 
The association was established in 1923 according to a passage in the football history books of Malaysia through an interview with Austin Senevirathe, 93 years old when interviewed. He stated about a match that happened between PBNS and Singapore for Malaya Cup in that particular year.
 
In 1927, PBNS started organizing league matches. Among the trophies that were up for grabs at that time were the Annex Shield, the British Resident's Cup and the Hose Cup. The earliest football clubs that existed and competed in the league were Negri Sembilan Chinese "A", Negri Sembilan Club, Port Dickson Recreation Club, Sungei Ujong Club, Negri Sembilan Chinese "B" and St. Paul's Old Boys Association.
 
In 1982, Tan Sri Dato' Seri Utama Mohd Isa bin Dato' Haji Abdul Samad was appointed president of the Negeri Sembilan Football Association (PBNS) as well as the Menteri Besar of Negeri Sembilan.
 
In March 2004, Datuk Seri Mohamad Hasan was appointed as the president of the Negeri Sembilan Football Association (PBNS). It's because he successfully held the position as the 10th Menteri Besar of Negeri Sembilan replaced Isa Samad who held that position the previous year. Mohamad Hasan was the first Menteri Besar who has ever been a local football player and then became the president of PBNS. He never represented the first team of Negeri Sembilan but played a lot with clubs in Kuala Lumpur and Selangor. He was banned from football for life after received a red card when NS Malays played against NS Indians in 1977. He was active in football around the 70s.
 
On 10 September 2018, Tunku Besar of Tampin, Tunku Syed Razman Tunku Syed Idrus Al-Qadri was elected as the new President of the Negeri Sembilan Football Association (PBNS) for the period of 2018-2021 after he won unopposed at the 86th PBNS Congress, at Klana Resort.

Management 
PBNS management is elected through the PBNS Congress held every 4 years.
 
The following are PBNS Executive committee members for the term 2022-2025.

This association is the owner of the Negeri Sembilan football team, known as Negeri Sembilan FC, for the professional football leagues in Malaysia. In addition, they organised several competitions in Negeri Sembilan, such as Piala Tuanku, which was organised in conjunction with the birthday of the Yang di-Pertuan Besar Negeri Sembilan.

President list

Office and facilities 
PBNS office is located at Wisma PBNS, Medan Rahang, Seremban where there are several facilities for the team to undergo training and the public can also use the facility. Among them is the PBNS Synthetic Field, Rahang which was completed in 2018 where this field is used by the teams, President's Cup and Youth Cup for training. The facility can also be used by the public if there is a vacancy with a rental rate that is relevant for the purpose of football recreation. This synthetic field is also equipped with floodlight facilities.

In addition to the football field facilities, PBNS also has the PBNS Kapten GYM a gym facility where they have collaborated with the Kapten GYM company to provide gym equipment for the players, staff and the general public at reasonable rental rates.

PBNS also has a 'PBNS Concept Store' that sells Kelme brand sports goods which is the official clothing sponsor of the Negeri Sembilan Team for the 2023 season. There are various types of clothing sold at the PBNS Concept Store such as Negeri Sembilan team jerseys, training shirts, Polo T shirts , sports pants and also sports clothes for children.

Competitions 
The Negeri Sembilan Football Association ran and organised the following competitions for the amateur clubs:

 Tuanku Cup
 Thivy Jaya Cup
 Negeri Sembilan Youth League U-23
 Negeri Sembilan Youth League U-20
 Negeri Sembilan Youth League U-18
 YAB Menteri Besar Negeri Sembilan Cup

Affiliated

Affiliated Clubs 
The clubs that are affiliated with the PBNS in the top three tiers of the Malaysian League include:

 Negeri Sembilan FC
 KSR SAINS F.C.

District Football Association 
District Football Association (DFA) is the governing body of football for the district in Negeri Sembilan. The DFA are responsible for coordinating the district football team and developing football in their district and also made up the structure of PBNS as the official governing body of football in the state of Negeri Sembilan.

There are 7 District Football Associations affiliated to the PBNS that playing in Tuanku Cup.

 Jelebu DFA
 Jempol DFA
 Kuala Pilah DFA
 Port Dickson DFA
 Rembau DFA
 Seremban DFA
 Tampin DFA

Women Football Club 

 Negeri Sembilan Women's

Youth Club 

 NS Soccer Academy

Affiliated Leagues

Men's Football Leagues 

 Seremban Business League
 Seremban Senior League
 Seremban Night League

Youth League 

 Grassroot Unity Cup U-12
 Grassroot Unity Cup U-10
 Grassroot Unity Cup U-8

References 

 
 
1923 establishments in British Malaya
Football associations in Malaysia
Sports organizations established in 1936
Seremban